United Nations Security Council Resolution 297, adopted unanimously on September 15, 1971, after examining the application of  Qatar for membership in the United Nations, the Council recommended to the General Assembly that Qatar be admitted.

See also
 List of United Nations Security Council Resolutions 201 to 300 (1965–1971)

References
Text of the Resolution at undocs.org

External links
 

 0297
 0297
 0297
1971 in Qatar
September 1971 events